St. Francis Xavier College is a 7–12 Catholic co-educational school in Victoria, Australia. As of 2021, it has over 3,000 students and 300 teaching staff.  It has campuses in Berwick, Beaconsfield and Officer.

Campuses 
St Francis Xavier College has three campuses:

 Beaconsfield - Opened in 1978, the campus houses students years 10-12. 
 Berwick - The Berwick campus was opened in 2003. It serves students years 7-9. 
 Officer - Having opened in 2012, the newest campus accommodates students years 7-9.

Curriculum 
St. Francis Xavier College offers it's senior students the Victorian Certificate of Education (VCE), the Victorian Certificate of Applied Learning (VCAL), and Vocational Education and Training (VET) programs.

Sport 
St. Francis Xavier College is a member of the Southern Independent Schools (SIS).

SIS premierships 
St. Francis Xavier College has won the following SIS senior premierships.

Combined:

 Athletics (7) - 2005, 2006, 2007, 2008, 2009, 2010, 2013

Boys:

 Basketball (3) - 2003, 2009, 2019
 Cricket (7) - 1999, 2001, 2002, 2004, 2010, 2015, 2016
 Football (12) - 1999, 2006, 2007, 2008, 2009, 2012, 2013, 2014, 2015, 2016, 2019
 Soccer (6) - 2008, 2011, 2014, 2015, 2019, 2020

Girls:

 Basketball (8) - 2001, 2004, 2008, 2009, 2013, 2016, 2017, 2018
 Football (5) - 2011, 2012, 2015, 2016, 2018
 Netball (11) - 2000, 2006, 2007, 2008, 2009, 2010, 2011, 2012, 2013, 2016, 2019
 Soccer (3) - 2015, 2016, 2020

Notable alumni
Steven Salopek, former AFL footballer for Port Adelaide.
Jake Aarts, AFL footballer for Richmond.
Tyanna Smith, AFLW footballer for St Kilda.
Georgia Gee, AFLW footballer for Essendon.

References

1978 establishments in Australia
Educational institutions established in 1978
Catholic secondary schools in Melbourne
Buildings and structures in the City of Casey
Buildings and structures in the Shire of Cardinia